Eathiestrobus mackenziei is a fossil pine cone found in the Kimmeridge Clay Formation (Upper Jurassic) near Eathie, on the Black Isle in Scotland. It is the oldest fossil pine currently known.

Etymology
The genus name Eathiestrobus refers to the place it was found, Eathie, in Scotland, and strobus, which means cone. The species name mackenziei honors Mr. W. Mackenzie, who collected the specimen and donated it to the Hunterian Museum in 1896.

Description

The holotype of Eathiestrobus mackenziei consists of an incomplete, 8 cm long seed cone. It is held in the Hunterian Museum and Art Gallery in Glasgow, and was originally identified as Pityostrobus, but later re-examined and reclassified as a new genus and species.

Significance

Eathiestrobus extends the fossil record for the family Pinaceae by around 20 million years. The oldest fossil pines were known from the Early Cretaceous (Pinus yorkshirensis and Pityostrobus californensis). Eathiestrobus was also important because it clarified the characteristics of the seed cones of Pinaceae, making it easier to identify members of the family in the fossil record.

References

Pinaceae
Prehistoric plant genera